Bob Harvey (born 1933) is an American bassist, best known as the original bassist of Jefferson Airplane.

With Jefferson Airplane
Harvey joined Jefferson Airplane in 1965 playing acoustic bass. In October 1965, the band felt he was not up to par, and he was replaced by Jack Casady.

Other projects
He co-founded the bluegrass group the Slippery Rock String Band.
He was in the Holy Mackerel, with Paul Williams who recorded the song "Wildflowers", and in San Francisco Blue with Brian Fowler.

They changed their name to Georgia Blue.

Bob Harvey currently plays in a duo with a local guitar player named Randy Gleason out of Lancaster, Ohio.

Family
Harvey grew up in San Francisco and today lives in Lancaster, Ohio. He is currently married to Joyce Russell Harvey. He has three children.

References

1933 births
Living people
Male double-bassists
American rock double-bassists
Musicians from San Francisco
Place of birth missing (living people)
Jefferson Airplane members
21st-century double-bassists